Geffen Records is an American record label established by David Geffen and owned by Universal Music Group through its Interscope Geffen A&M Records imprint.

Founded in 1980, Geffen Records has been a part of Interscope Geffen A&M since 1999 and has been used by Universal Music as a syndicating division, serving its purpose to operate as a premier label for many new releases since 2003 and its 2017 reboot and at the same time to reissue many releases from recording labels such as Decca Records (exclusively the American pop/rock catalog), Kapp Records, DreamWorks Records, MCA Records, Uni Records, Chess Records, Almo Sounds (Interscope has managed reissues of the label in 2015), Dot Records, and ABC Records (primarily its pop, rock, and R&B recordings).

The label has released significant recordings from artists including Elton John, Kylie Minogue, Enya, Counting Crows, Cher, Guns N' Roses, Tesla, John Lennon, Joni Mitchell, Aerosmith, Neil Young, Peter Gabriel, Donna Summer, Nirvana, Weezer, Mary J. Blige, Blink-182, Avicii, Keyshia Cole, Lifehouse, Beck, Nelly Furtado, Lil Durk, Marshmello, Hotboii, Rise Against, Olivia Rodrigo, Snoop Dogg, and Rob Zombie.

History

Formation (1980–1990) 
Geffen Records began operations in 1980, having been started by music industry businessman David Geffen who, in the early 1970s, had founded Asylum Records. Geffen stepped down from Asylum in 1975, when he crossed over to film and was named a vice president of Warner Bros. Pictures. He was fired from Warner circa 1978, but still remained locked in a five-year contract, which prevented him from working elsewhere. When that deal expired, he returned to work in 1980 and struck a deal with, ironically, Warner Records, the sister company to Warner Bros. Pictures, to create Geffen Records. Warner Bros. Records provided 100 percent of the funding for the label's start-up and operations and Warner distributed its releases in North America, while Epic Records handled distribution in the rest of the world until 1985 when Warner Music Group (WMG) took over distribution for the rest of the world. Profits were split 50/50 between Geffen Records and its respective distributors.

Geffen Records' first artist signing was superstar Donna Summer, whose gold-selling album The Wanderer became the label's first release in 1980. The label then released Double Fantasy by John Lennon and Yoko Ono. Two weeks after it entered the charts, Lennon was murdered in New York City. Subsequently, the album went on to sell millions and gave Geffen its first number-one album and single; the rights to the album would later be taken over by EMI, which eventually was absorbed by Geffen's parent, Universal Music Group (The present incarnation of MCA).

As the 1980s progressed, Geffen would go on to have success with such acts as Berlin, Enya, Kylie Minogue, Quarterflash, Wang Chung, and Sammy Hagar. The label also signed several established acts such as Elton John, Irene Cara, Cher, Debbie Harry, Don Henley, Joni Mitchell, Neil Young, Peter Gabriel, and Jennifer Holliday. Toward the end of the decade, the company also began making a name for itself as an emerging rock label, thanks to the success of Whitesnake (U.S. and Canada only), The Stone Roses, Guns N' Roses, Tesla, Sonic Youth and the comeback of 1970s-era rockers Aerosmith.  This prompted Geffen to create a subsidiary label, DGC Records in 1990; which focused on more progressive rock and would later embrace the emergence of alternative rock—Nirvana being an example. Geffen also briefly distributed the first incarnation of Def American Recordings through Warner Music Group from 1988 to 1990.

Acquisition by MCA (1990–1998) 
After a decade of operating through WMG, when its contract with the company expired, the label was sold to MCA Music Entertainment (later renamed Universal Music Group) in 1990. The deal ultimately earned David Geffen an estimated US$800 million in stock (until the cash acquisition of MCA by Japanese conglomerate Matsushita Electric Industrial Co., Ltd. in 1991 made Geffen a billionaire) and an employment contract that ran until 1995. Following the sale, Geffen Records operated as one of MCA's leading independently managed labels. Geffen stepped down as head of the label in 1995 to collaborate with Jeffrey Katzenberg and Steven Spielberg to form DreamWorks SKG, an ambitious multimedia empire dealing in film, television, books and music. Geffen Records would distribute releases on the new operation's DreamWorks Records subsidiary. In January 1996, Geffen Records funded and distributed a short-lived boutique label Outpost Recordings featuring the likes of Whiskeytown, Ry Cooder, Veruca Salt, and Hayden. However, under MCA, Geffen's fortunes began to dwindle.

Interscope-Geffen-A&M (1999–present) 
In December 1998, Seagram decided to merge Universal Music Group with PolyGram. In the ensuing months, a number of corporate reshufflings occurred, resulting in Geffen, alongside A&M Records, being merged into the Interscope Geffen A&M Records group, resulting in Geffen firing 110 of its employees. Unlike A&M, which was closed entirely, Geffen was able to continue existing as a brand under Interscope Records. At the same time, international distribution of Interscope and Geffen releases switched to ex-PolyGram label Polydor Records, which had already been distributing A&M releases overseas (in return for A&M handling Polydor releases in the U.S.).

In October 1999, Jordan Schur (of Flip Records) was chosen as Geffen's new president; this led to Schur stepping down as the head of Flip, but he still managed to maintain control of the label and a few acts from Flip's roster, such as Cold and Professional Murder Music, were transferred over to Geffen. Geffen's first release under Schur's leadership was the End of Days soundtrack, released in November 1999, and under the direction of Schur, Geffen was to become a predominantly rock music-based label.

Geffen continued to do steady business—so much so that in 2003, UMG folded MCA Records into Geffen. Though Geffen had been substantially a pop-rock label, its absorption of MCA (and its back catalogs) led to a more diverse roster; with former MCA artists such as Mary J. Blige, The Roots, Blink-182, Rise Against and Common now featured on the label.  Meanwhile, DreamWorks Records also folded, with artists such as Nelly Furtado, Lifehouse and Rufus Wainwright being absorbed by Geffen as well. During this time, DGC Records was also folded into Geffen, with retained artists now recording for Geffen directly (DGC was reactivated in 2007, however it would now operate through Interscope Records instead).

As the 2000s progressed, Geffen's absorption of the MCA and DreamWorks labels, along with continuing to sign new acts such as Ashlee Simpson, Angels & Airwaves, Snoop Dogg and The Game, had boosted the company to the extent that it began gaining equal footing with the main Interscope label, leading some industry insiders to speculate that it could revert to operating as an independently managed imprint at UMG again. At the end of 2007, however, Geffen was absorbed further into Interscope. The restructuring resulted in Geffen laying off sixty employees.

In 2009, it was announced that Geffen Records had signed an agreement with the Holy See to produce an album of Marian songs and prayers from Pope Benedict XVI.

Jimmy Iovine relaunched the Geffen imprint in 2011, moving its headquarters from California to New York City. Gee Roberson was appointed chairman.

In March 2017, Neil Jacobson was appointed President of Geffen Records to oversee the relaunch of the label via new signings as well as reinvigoration of the label's legendary catalog. In December 2019, Jacobson left Geffen to start Crescent Drive Productions.

In January 2020, Lee L'Heureux was appointed General Manager of Geffen Records.

Labels 

 Cinematic Music Group
 Downtown Records
 Joytime Collective
 Rebel Music
 Simple Stupid Records
 SpindleHorse Music (co-owned with Vivienne Medrano's company, SpindleHorse Toons)

Artists

Current artists 

 Abby Jasmine (Cinematic Music Group/Geffen Records; distribution formaily licensed to Foundation Media)
 Ado (Virgin/Geffen)
 Ann Marie
 Big Time Rush (Downtown Records/Geffen Records)
 Dave
 Dexter Tortoriello (Downtown Records/Geffen Records)
 Hotboii (Rebel Music/Geffen Records)
 Kali Uchis (EMI/Geffen; Previously with Interscope)
 Le Sserafim (Source Music; distribution in the US)
 Huddy
 Kenneth Cash (Cinematic Music Group/Geffen Records)
 Lil Heat (Cinematic Music Group/Geffen Records; distribution licensed to Ingrooves and previously with Foundation Media)
 Lola Kirke (Downtown Records/Geffen Records)
 Lul Bob (Good Money Global/Cinematic Music Group/Geffen Records; distribution licensed to Ingrooves and previously with Foundation Media)
 Marshmello (Joytime Collective/Geffen Records)
 midwxst (Simple Stupid/Geffen Records)
 Neon Trees (Thrill Forever Records/Downtown Records/Geffen Records)
 iayze (Simple Stupid/Geffen Records; distribution licensed to Ingrooves and previously with Foundation Media)
 Ola Runt (Front Street/Cinematic Music Group/Geffen Records; distribution formaily licensed to Ingrooves and previously with Foundation Media)
 Olivia Rodrigo
 Parry Gripp (SpindleHorse/Geffen)
 Prentiss (Cinematic Music Group/Geffen Records)
 Rob49 (Rebel Music/Geffen Records; distribution licensed to Ingrooves and previously with Foundation Media)
 Seventeen (Pledis Entertainment; distribution in the US)
 Silva Hound (SpindleHorse/Geffen)
 skaiwater (Cinematic Music Group/Geffen Records)
 SpotemGottem (Rebel Music/Geffen Records)
 Tay Money
 The Living Tombstone (SpindleHorse/Geffen)
 Tokyo's Revenge (Blac Noize!/Cypress Park Music/Geffen Records/Interscope Records; distribution licensed to Foundation Media)
 Yeat (Field Trip/TwizzyRich/Geffen Records)
 Yungblud (Locomotion/Geffen Records)
 Zack Bia (Field Trip/Geffen)

Former artists 
 A Drop in the Gray
 Aerosmith (from Columbia Records)
 Aimee Mann
 Alex Salibian
 AlunaGeorge
 Angels & Airwaves
 Ashlee Simpson
 Avant (from Magic Johnson Music/MCA Records)
 Avicii
 Bipolar Sunshine
 Blaque
 blink-182 (from MCA Records)
 Box Car Racer
 Bobby Brown
 Cher
 Common (GOOD/Geffen, from MCA Records)
 Counting Crows
 Cowboy Junkies
 Dazz Band
 DJ Snake
 Don Henley
 Donna Summer
 Eagles
 Elton John
 Emile Haynie
 Enya
 Eve (from Ruff Ryders/Interscope)
 Field Mob (Disturbing tha Peace/Geffen, from MCA Records)
 Finch (from Drive-Thru Records)
 The Game (from Aftermath/G-Unit/Interscope)
 Garbage (from Almo Sounds)
 Girlicious
 Greyson Chance (eleveneleven/Maverick/Geffen)
 Gryffin
 Guns N' Roses
 GZA
 Jacob Collier
 Jeff Bhasker
 Jennifer Holliday
 J.I the Prince of N.Y (G*STARR/Interscope/Geffen)
 John Lennon
 John Waite
 Ken Laszlo
 Keyshia Cole
 Kylie Minogue
 Lifehouse
 Lil Durk (from Alamo/OTF/Interscope)
 Lil Jon
 Martin Terefe
 Mary J. Blige (from MCA Records)
 Mura Masa
 Nelly Furtado (from DreamWorks Records)
 New Found Glory
 Nirvana (from DGC Records)
 Orianthi
 Peter Gabriel (US/Canada)
 Quarterflash
 The Plimsouls
 Puddle of Mudd
 Rise Against
 Rod Wave (from Alamo; distribution licensed to Foundation Media and previously with EMPIRE)
 The Roots (from DGC Records, later switched to MCA Records, then back to Geffen)
 Sauce Money (Roc-A-Fella/Geffen, Later switched to MCA)
 Shaggy (from MCA Records)
 Smokepurpp (from Alamo/Interscope)
 Snoop Dogg (Doggy Style/Star Trak/Geffen, from MCA Records)
 Solange (Music World/Geffen)
 Sonic Youth
 The Starting Line (from Drive-Thru Records)
 Tesla
 Tei Shi (Downtown Records/Geffen)
 Tommy Keene
 The Like
 XTC
 Yoko Ono 
 Weezer
 Wang Chung

See also 
 Geffen Records discography
 John Kalodner
 List of record labels

References

External links 
  - Geffen Records is included within the Interscope site and is part of Interscope-Geffen-A&M
 

American record labels
Record labels based in California
New York (state) record labels
American country music record labels
Heavy metal record labels
Pop record labels
Rock record labels
Record labels established in 1980
1980 establishments in California
Companies based in New York City
Labels distributed by Universal Music Group
David Geffen